Kaykaus, Keykavus, Kai Kaus, Keikavoos, or Keykavos, may refer to:

People
 Kai Kaus (11th century)
 Izeddin Kaykaus
 Kaykaus I (died 1220)
 Kaykaus II (died 1279/1280)
 Kay Kāvus, legendary king
 Rukunuddin Kaikaus, Sultan of Bengal

Places
 Keykavus, Chaharmahal and Bakhtiari, Iran
 Keykavus, Khuzestan, Iran
 Keykavus-e Aghajari, Khuzestan Province, Iran